During the Middle Ages, an  (sometimes given as modern English: advocate;;) was an office-holder who was legally delegated to perform some of the secular responsibilities of a major feudal lord, or for an institution such as an abbey. Many such positions developed, especially in the Holy Roman Empire. Typically, these evolved to include responsibility for aspects of the daily management of agricultural lands, villages and cities.

These were originally lay lords, who not only helped defend religious institutions in the secular world, but were also responsible for exercising lordly responsibilities within the church's lands, such as the handling of legal cases which might require the use of a death penalty. The positions of these office-holders eventually came to be seen as inheritable titles themselves, with their own feudal privileges connected to them.

The  as an officer of a court of law first appeared in the 12th and 13th centuries, concomitant with the rediscovery of Roman law.

Nomenclature
The terms used in various European languages derive from a general Latin term for any person called upon to stand for another.

Ecclesiastical advocates
These advocates were specially bound to represent their clients before the secular courts. They exercised civil jurisdiction in the domain of the church or monastery, and were bound to protect the church with arms in the event of actual assault. Finally, it was their duty to lead the men-at-arms in the name of the church or monastery, and to command them in time of war. In return for these services the advocate received certain definite revenues from the possessions of the church, in the form of supplies or services, which he could demand, or in the form of a lien on the church property.

Such advocates are to be found even in Roman times; a Synod of Carthage decreed, in 401, that the emperor should be requested to provide, in conjunction with the bishops,  for the churches. There is evidence, moreover, for such  in Italy, at the close of the fifth century, but Pope Gregory I confined the office to members of the clergy. It was the duty of these  to protect the poor, and to defend the rights and possessions of the church.

A Capitulary of about 790 ordained that the higher clergy, "for the sake of the church's honour, and the respect due to the priesthood" should have advocates. Charlemagne, who obliged bishops, abbots and abbesses to maintain , commanded to exercise great care in the choice of persons to fill the office; they must be judicious men, familiar with the law, and owning property in the—then still administrative—countship. The churches, monasteries and canonries, as such, alike received advocates, who by degrees assumed the position above defined.

Under the Carolingians it was made obligatory for bishops, abbots and abbesses to appoint such officials in every county where they held property. The office was not at first hereditary nor even for life, the  being chosen, either by the abbot alone, or by the abbot and bishop concurrently with the count.

In the post-Carolingian period it developed into a hereditary office, and was held by powerful nobles, who constantly endeavoured to enlarge their rights in connection with the church or the monastery. Conciliar decrees were passed as early as the ninth century to protect ecclesiastical institutions against the excessive claims of their advocates, who indeed became in many ways a heavy burden to their ecclesiastical clients. They dealt with the possessions entrusted to them as with their own property, plundered the church estate, appropriated the tithes and other revenues, and oppressed in every possible way those whom they were appointed to protect.

The office, since it offered many advantages, was eagerly sought after. The excessive claims of the advocates gave rise to many disputes between them and the churches or monasteries. The bishops and abbots, who found their rights seriously curtailed, appealed to the Holy Roman Emperor and to the Pope for protection. In the twelfth century grave warnings issued from Rome, restraining the high-handed actions of the advocates under pain of severe ecclesiastical penalties, which still did not put an end to all the abuses that prevailed. On certain occasions, emperors and princes exercised the office of advocate, in which case they appointed deputy-advocates to represent them.

Such representatives had been assigned to the church since late antiquity, as it was not supposed to act for itself in worldly affairs. Therefore, in areas such as the territories of abbeys and bishoprics, which by virtue of their ecclesiastical status were free (or immune) from the secular government of the local count (in origin an administrative official in charge of a territory and reporting to the emperor), the  fulfilled the function of a protective lordship, generally commanding the military contingents of such areas. Beyond that, he administered the high justice instead of the count from the  court (or ).

In Austria, the teaching of the Church that, according to canon law individuals were prohibited from exercising authority over Church property, was only with reluctance accepted by the nobles. The rights of advocacy were bought back by the thirteenth- and fourteenth-century abbeys in alliance with the Babenberg and early Habsburg dukes; the abolition of the  thereby exchanged local secular jurisdiction for the protective overlordship of the duke of Austria, sometimes by forging charters that the duke confirmed.

Imperial advocates
An imperial advocateship tended to become hereditary.

In the German-ruled Holy Roman Empire, the term  can refer to two different offices: church  or imperial . Imperial  are further subdivided into land  and city . In addition, the term  was used for administrative officers of territorial rulers, such as reeves and bailiffs.

An imperial was an officer of the king, who served as administrator and judge of a subdivision of royal property, or of a royal abbey. The seat of an imperial Reichsvogt was often at an imperial city. When the imperial cities gained more independence, the office was split into city  for the cities and land  for other areas. The offices of city  were usually bought by the imperial cities by the late Middle Ages, which led to the independence of the cities. Most land  offices became meaningless as the amount of royal property was reduced more and more in favor of territorial rulers (such as dukes and counts).

A Burgvogt was a castle administrator responsible for the general running of a castle and also for exercising jurisdical powers. The term is still sometimes encountered for someone who manages a castle.

However, the cities were soon thereafter annexed by France.

Several small land  continued to exist until the end of the Empire in 1806, mainly in the Swabian Circle.

In France
The second class included the petty lords who held their advocateships as hereditary fiefs and often as their sole means of subsistence. An abbey's , of this class, corresponded to a bishop's vidame. Their function was generally to represent the abbot in his capacity as feudal lord, act as his representative in the courts of his superior, exercise secular justice in the abbot's name in the abbatial court, and lead the retainers of the abbey to battle under the banner of the patron saint.

Initially, only counts and dukes were appointed , but by the end of the 11th century the title was being bestowed on mere castellans. The monks usually consulted their advocate before electing a new abbot, giving the advocate influence over the selection. When a nobleman founded or reformed a monastery, he usually became its advocate. In the 12th century, the office of the advocate was on the decline, a result of the Gregorian reforms.
The Cistercian Order, for example, never allowed lay advocates.

In the Low Countries

The  played a more important part in the feudal polity of the Empire and of the Low Countries than in France, where his functions, confined to the protection of the interests of religious houses, were superseded from the 13th century onwards by the growth of central power and the increasing efficiency of royal administration. They had, in effect, long ceased to be effective in their original purpose, and after the advowson became a fief, they took advantage of their position to pillage and suppress those they were supposed to defend.

In the Netherlands (as well as in Germany)  were often appointed in the cities, by the overlord or by the emperor, to take the place of the bailiff (Dutch , German ) or to stand alongside this official in matters of law.

In England
In England, the word  was never used to denote a hereditary representative of an abbot; but in some of the larger abbeys there were hereditary stewards whose functions and privileges were not dissimilar to those of the continental . Instead, the word , or more commonly avowee, was in constant use in England to denote the patron of an ecclesiastical benefice, whose sole right of any importance was a hereditary one of presenting a parson to the bishop for institution. In this way the hereditary right of presentation to a benefice came to be called in English an advowson.

Old Swiss Confederacy

The title of  appears in the Old Swiss Confederacy in 1415.

This concerned  in particular, which was nominally a subject territory of Bern, but enjoyed a special status as a military ally.

Habsburg Netherlands

Although the title of Duke of Burgundy was extinguished by the French king after the annexation of its ancestral lands in 1477, the Habsburg kings of Spain and archdukes of Austria continued to use the title to refer to their realms in the Netherlands.

Parallels in medieval England and France
The status of protective lordship, however, in relation to ecclesiastical estates as held, and notoriously abused, by the nobility in Germany throughout the Middle Ages, is without close parallel. There is no single equivalent in English history. The office of reeve was much the same at a village or peasant level, and in other contexts the roles of sheriff, bailiff, seneschal and castellan of course included similar elements. The most frequent translations in that connection are either advocate or lord protector.

Modern Europe

Poland

Denmark
In Danish, the word  carries different connotations, all pertaining to guarding or keeping watch over something.

Finland
The local bailiff (distrainer) is called , where  (hundred) is a local judicial district. Their duty is to enforce the financial judgements of the local courts. In practice, the  leads a team of assistant distrainers who process most distrainments/garnishments.

Netherlands
In modern Dutch, the word  is the primary word for the concept of legal guardian.

See also

Vidame
Schultheiß

References

Further reading
 Charles West, "The Significance of the Carolingian Advocate", Early Medieval Europe 17 (2009), pp. 186–206

German feudalism
Judges
Medieval titles
Titles of nobility of the Holy Roman Empire
Feudalism
Legal professions
Catholic ecclesiastical titles
Historical legal occupations